DWSW (104.7 FM), broadcasting as Radyo Sagada 104.7, is a radio station owned by the National Council of Churches in the Philippines and operated by Kodao Productions. Its studio and transmitter are located in Ato, Barangay Poblacion, Sagada. It serves as the community station for the people of Sagada.

References

Radio stations established in 2011